Dapdap High School is a secondary school located at Dapdap Resettlement Area, Bamban, Tarlac, Philippines.

Faculty member Ruperto G. Patangui, Jr. became the first recipient of the Outstanding ICT Teacher award, in December 2007. He is credited for the development of the official website of DepED Tarlac Province, the first schools division website in
the region.

References

External links
 Tarlac Province Schools Division site

Educational institutions with year of establishment missing
High schools in Tarlac